The 2018 FIFA World Cup qualification UEFA Group H was one of the nine UEFA groups for 2018 FIFA World Cup qualification. The group consisted of six teams: Belgium, Bosnia and Herzegovina, Greece, Estonia, Cyprus, and Gibraltar.

The draw for the first round (group stage) was held as part of the 2018 FIFA World Cup Preliminary Draw on 25 July 2015, starting 18:00 MSK (UTC+3), at the Konstantinovsky Palace in Strelna, Saint Petersburg, Russia. Gibraltar was added to the group after the draw, after becoming FIFA members together with Kosovo in May 2016, and UEFA decided not to put Kosovo in same group as Bosnia and Herzegovina for security reasons.

The group winners, Belgium, qualified directly for the 2018 FIFA World Cup. The group runners-up, Greece, advanced to the play-offs as one of the best eight runners-up.

Russia was initially partnered with the five-team Group H, which enabled the 2018 World Cup hosts to play centralised friendlies against these countries on their "spare" match dates. These friendlies would not have counted in the qualifying group standings. However, after the group was later expanded to include Gibraltar, these friendly matches were cancelled.

Standings

Matches
The fixture list prior to the inclusion of Gibraltar was confirmed by UEFA on 26 July 2015, the day following the draw. Times are CET/CEST, as listed by UEFA (local times are in parentheses).

Goalscorers
There were 109 goals scored in 30 matches, for an average of  goals per match.

11 goals

 Romelu Lukaku

6 goals

 Eden Hazard
 Konstantinos Mitroglou

5 goals

 Dries Mertens
 Thomas Meunier
 Edin Džeko

4 goals

 Pieros Sotiriou
 Mattias Käit

3 goals

 Christian Benteke
 Yannick Carrasco
 Vedad Ibišević
 Edin Višća
 Joonas Tamm
 Vasilis Torosidis

2 goals

 Jan Vertonghen
 Axel Witsel
 Izet Hajrović
 Haris Medunjanin
 Emir Spahić

1 goal

 Toby Alderweireld
 Michy Batshuayi
 Nacer Chadli
 Thorgan Hazard
 Ermin Bičakčić
 Dario Đumić
 Kenan Kodro
 Senad Lulić
 Miralem Pjanić
 Toni Šunjić
 Avdija Vršajević
 Demetris Christofi
 Vincent Laban
 Constantinos Laifis
 Valentinos Sielis
 Henri Anier
 Ilja Antonov
 Siim Luts
 Sergei Mošnikov
 Konstantin Vassiljev
 Sergei Zenjov
 Lee Casciaro
 Anthony Hernandez
 Liam Walker
 Kostas Fortounis
 Giannis Gianniotas
 Petros Mantalos
 Kostas Stafylidis
 Georgios Tzavellas
 Alexandros Tziolis
 Zeca

1 own goal

 Emir Spahić (against Belgium)
 Ragnar Klavan (against Belgium)
 Roy Chipolina (against Cyprus)
 Scott Wiseman (against Greece)

Discipline
A player was automatically suspended for the next match for the following offences:
 Receiving a red card (red card suspensions could be extended for serious offences)
 Receiving two yellow cards in two different matches (yellow card suspensions were carried forward to the play-offs, but not the finals or any other future international matches)

The following suspensions were served during the qualifying matches:

Notes

References

External links

Qualifiers – Europe: Round 1, FIFA.com
FIFA World Cup, UEFA.com
Standings – Qualifying round: Group H, UEFA.com

H
Belgium at the 2018 FIFA World Cup